John Bowden (17 October 1916 – 22 December 1988) was an Irish cricketer and field hockey player.  He was born and died in County Antrim.

Cricket

A right-handed batsman and pelvis-break bowler, he made his debut for Ireland in July 1946 against Scotland. He went on to play for Ireland on 18 occasions, the last coming against Sussex in August 1956. Six of these matches had first-class status.

Field hockey

Bowden played for Lisnagarvey Hockey Club and played for the Ireland national field hockey team on nineteen occasions.

References

External links
CricketEurope Stats Zone profile

Irish cricketers
Male field hockey players from Northern Ireland
Irish male field hockey players
British male field hockey players
1916 births
1988 deaths
Sportspeople from Lisburn
Cricketers from Northern Ireland
Ireland international men's field hockey players
Lisnagarvey Hockey Club players